KAYL-FM (101.7 FM) is a radio station licensed to serve the community of Storm Lake, Iowa.  KAYL-FM was owned by Sorenson Broadcasting Corporation and transferred to Community First Broadcasting.

KAYL-FM began broadcasting on 101.5 MHz in 1949 and was owned by Cornbelt Broadcasting Company with the original shareholders of Oscar Grau, Joe Kavane, Paul Dlugosch, Dr. R.E. Malliard and Z.Z. White.

KAYL-FM upgraded the FM transmitter and began broadcasting in stereo in June 1979.  The frequency change to 101.7 MHz occurred in September 1995.

The broadcast tower, located east of Storm Lake, collapsed on August 8, 1969, during a severe storm. The station was back on the air with a temporary antenna within about 6½ hours.

In November 1997, KBVU-FM at Buena Vista University started broadcasting from the KAYL tower. KAYL-FM became the property of NRG Media in 2005, along with its sister AM station, KAYL and sister FM stations, KKIA.  The KAYL/KKIA studios were located at 606½ Lake Avenue in downtown Storm Lake beginning in 1948, in 200? the studios were relocated to 910 Flindt Drive in Storm Lake.

KAYL-FM had an easy listening format until 1987, when it changed to an adult contemporary format as "Lite Gold".  In 1990, the station was purchased by Hedberg Broadcasting, and became "Iowa's Best FM--KAYL" with a hotter AC format.  The station is a Fox News Radio and Radio Iowa affiliate, with an extensive schedule of local information, and local sports coverage.

External links

AYL
Buena Vista University
Radio stations established in 1949
1949 establishments in Iowa
Hot adult contemporary radio stations in the United States